Lucas dos Santos Cordeiro (born November 1, 1991) is a Brazilian professional footballer who plays as a forward.

Career

Early career
Cordeiro played four years of college soccer at Oklahoma Wesleyan University between 2011 and 2014. In four years with the Eagles, he tallied 48 goals and 51 assists.

Professional
Cordeiro signed with United Soccer League club Tulsa Roughnecks in March 2015.

On June 23, 2019, Cordeiro made his National Premier Soccer League debut for FC Wichita. He scored a goal in the 85th minute.

References

External links 
 OKWU Eagles profile
 Tulsa Roughnecks profile

1991 births
Living people
Brazilian footballers
Brazilian expatriate footballers
Oklahoma Wesleyan Eagles soccer players
FC Tulsa players
Association football forwards
Brazilian expatriate sportspeople in the United States
Expatriate soccer players in the United States
USL Championship players
Footballers from Belo Horizonte